Geosesarma malayanum is a species of small red crab  found in Malaysia. It is famous for its relationship with pitcher plants; as such, it is classified as a nepenthephile. G. malayanum is known to visit Nepenthes ampullaria plants and raid the pitchers of their contents. It uses its claws to crush and consume the drowned prey. However,  the crabs reportedly are occasionally trapped by pitchers in Brunei.

References

External links

Grapsoidea
Freshwater crustaceans of Asia
Nepenthes infauna
Crustaceans described in 1986